Jefferson Township is one of the twelve townships of Greene County, Ohio, United States. As of the 2010 census the township population was 1,254, of whom 942 lived in the unincorporated portion.

Geography
Located in the southeastern corner of the county, it borders the following townships:
Silvercreek Township - north
Jasper Township, Fayette County - east
Wilson Township, Clinton County - southeast
Liberty Township, Clinton County - southwest
Caesarscreek Township - west

The village of Bowersville is located in central Jefferson Township.

Name and history
Jefferson Township was organized in 1858. It is named for Thomas Jefferson, third President of the United States.

It is one of twenty-four Jefferson Townships statewide.

Government
The township is governed by a three-member board of trustees, who are elected in November of odd-numbered years to a four-year term beginning on the following January 1. Two are elected in the year after the presidential election and one is elected in the year before it. There is also an elected township fiscal officer, who serves a four-year term beginning on April 1 of the year after the election, which is held in November of the year before the presidential election. Vacancies in the fiscal officership or on the board of trustees are filled by the remaining trustees.

References

External links
County website

Townships in Greene County, Ohio
1858 establishments in Ohio
Populated places established in 1858
Townships in Ohio